Christoph Wilhelm Marcus Schroder (born 1871) was a German biologist and entomologist. He was a professor in Berlin.

Publications
Selected
with Otto Schmiedeknecht, Jean-Jacques Kieffer, Heinrich Friese, Hermann Stitz  and Eduard Enslin, Die insekten Mitteleuropas insbesondere Deutschlands. Stuttgart: Franckhsche verlagshandlung, 1914-[1926]
Handbuch der entomologie, Jena: Gustav Fischer, [1912]-1929 BHL
Handbuch für Naturfreunde, Vol. 1 and 2, Kosmos-Frankch, [1910], 1912

References

German entomologists
1871 births
Year of death missing